N'Délé Airport  is an airport serving N'Délé, a town in the Bamingui-Bangoran prefecture of the Central African Republic. The airport is on the northwest edge of the town.

See also

Transport in the Central African Republic
List of airports in the Central African Republic

References

External links 
OpenStreetMap - Ndélé Airport
OurAirports - Ndélé Airport

Airports in the Central African Republic
Buildings and structures in Bamingui-Bangoran
N'Délé